Werribee City Football Club is an Australia semi-professional soccer club based in Werribee, Melbourne, currently playing in the National Premier Leagues Victoria 2 competition. The club plays its home games at Galvin Park Reserve (Benlor Ground), Werribee.

National Premier Leagues Victoria 
After the introduction of the National Premier Leagues Victoria, Werribee City were placed into the top division, the new top tier of football in the state. In the final game of the 2014 season, Port Melbourne SC scored a 95th minute goal, keeping both it and Werribee in the top division and relegating Ballarat City FC.

After a poor start to the 2015 season, with the Bees languishing in relegation places, manager Nino Ragusa was replaced and Tony Trifunov took over the reins. Trifunov's reign last just a few rounds, with the Bees then appointing Domenico Gangemi to finish off the 2015 season. Werribee City was relegated from the top flight of football in Victoria after a 13th-placed finish. 

Ahead of the 2016 season, the Werribee squad underwent an overhaul, with a large portion of the 2015 squad departing the club upon the conclusion of the campaign. Werribee had a disastrous start to the season, managing just a single point in their first six games, losing Domenico Marafioti to a shoulder injury and bowing out of the 2016 FFA Cup at the first hurdle, losing 3–0 to Dandenong Thunder. This led to the departure of Gangemi, who resigned on 6 April 2016. Former Bulleen Lions manager Serge Sabbadini was appointed as the new Werribee City manager. The Bees then experienced an upturn in form; after picking up just two points in the opening 11 rounds, Werribee then collected five wins and four draws from its next 11 games to finish the season in 8th place. 

The following season, Werribee again finished in 8th place finish in the NPL2 West competition. In 2018, Werribee finished in 5th place. For the 2019 season, Werribee finished in third place.

Former players
 Hrvoje Matkovic
 Danny Tiatto
 Joe Spiteri
 Craig Moore
 Christopher Cristaldo
 Simon Colosimo

Top goalscorers

Denotes top goalscorer in the league

Honours
 Provisional League Division Champions  1977
 Provisional League Cup Winners     1977
 Metro League Division 4 Champions     1980
 Promotion to Metro League Division 2    1981
 Promotion to Metro League Division 2     1982
 Victorian State League Cup Champions  1992
 Victorian Division 1 State League Champions  1993
 Provisional League Division 1 Champions   2004
 Moreland Charity Cup Winners  2006
 State League 3 Champions     2006
 State League 2 Runners-up    2007
 State League 2 Runners-up    2008
 State League 2 Champions     2011
 State League 1 Runners-up    2013

Individual honours
 2012 Simon Zappia League B&F 21 votes
 2012 Simon Zappia League Top Goalscorer 16 Goals

References

External links

Association football clubs established in 1969
National Premier Leagues clubs
Soccer clubs in Melbourne
1968 establishments in Australia
Italian-Australian culture in Melbourne
Italian-Australian backed sports clubs of Victoria
Sport in the City of Wyndham
Werribee, Victoria